David Hare may refer to:

David Hare (philanthropist) (1775–1842), Scottish philanthropist
David Hare (artist) (1917–1992), American sculptor and photographer
David Hare (playwright) (born 1947),  English playwright and theatre and film director

See also 
David O'Hare (born 1990), Irish tennis player
David Hare Block, a part of Kolkata Medical College Hospital in West Bengal, India